Billy 'Buff' McMurray (born 9 March 1943) was a Scottish footballer who played for Albion Rovers and Dumbarton.

References

1943 births
Scottish footballers
Dumbarton F.C. players
Albion Rovers F.C. players
Scottish Football League players
Living people
Place of birth missing (living people)
Association football fullbacks